Lizard is a short film co-written by Akinola Davies and Wale Davies and directed by Davies. It was the only Nigerian submission at the 2021 Sundance Film Festival and the first Nigerian production to win the Grand Jury Prize at the festival.

Plot 
Lizard tells the story of Juwon, an 8 year old girl who gets kicked out of Sunday school for having the extraordinary ability for sensing danger. She gets involved in criminal activities following this.

Cast 

 Pamilerin Ayodeji as Juwon
 Osayi Uzameren as Robbery Leader
 Charles Etubiebi as Adamu
 Rita Edward as Aunty Titi
 Nmasinachi Chikebulbe as Baby
 Morgan Samuel as Robber
 Matthew Solomon as Robber
 Fadeyi Ibrahim as Robber
 Issah Ibrahim as Robber
 Jamal Ibrahim as Mr. Peters
 Erezi Ebulu as Woman in Counting Room
 Demi Olunbanwo as Pastor Emeka
 Gwen Jemila as Attractive Woman
 Patrick Diabuah as Pastor Tony
 Halimat Olanrewaju as Dele
 Ikponmwosa Gold as Monday
 Naomi Akalanze as Morayo
 Mosorire Oluwa as Lola
 Genoveva Umeh as Kafilat
 Lala Akindoju as Patience
 Ade Laoye as Yemi /  Mummy

Production 
Lizard was set in 1990s Lagos and based on a real life event that happened to Akinola Davies but was infused with fantasy.

Reception 
Lizard won the Grand Jury Prize at the 2021 Sundance Film Festival.

References

External links 

Sundance Film Festival award winners
Films set in the 1990s
2020s English-language films